Glivenko's theorem may refer to:

 Glivenko's theorem (probability theory)
 Glivenko's theorem or Glivenko's translation, a double-negation translation for propositional logic

See also
 Glivenko–Cantelli theorem
 Glivenko–Stone theorem